Chushadestan (also Romanized as Chūshādestān; also known as Choosha Hanestan, Chūshāhestān, and Chushastan) is a village in Kurka Rural District, in the Central District of Astaneh-ye Ashrafiyeh County, Gilan Province, Iran. As of the 2006 census, its population was 19, in 6 families.

References 

Populated places in Astaneh-ye Ashrafiyeh County